According to the Book of Mormon, Amulon was a Nephite that lived in the 2nd century BC.  He was one of the wicked priests of the ill-fated King Noah.  Upon King Noah's death and the invasion of the Lamanites into the land of Nephi, Amulon and a group of priests (later dubbed Amulonites) fled into the wilderness where they kidnapped 24 Lamanite women to be their new wives. The Amulonites were later found by the Lamanite army in a place which they had named Amulon (after their leader).  After persuading the Lamanites to spare their lives, the people joined the Lamanites in returning to the land of Nephi, only to stumble upon the group settled at Helam, led by Alma the Elder (who was also once a priest of King Noah). Amulon was then placed as a puppet ruler by the Lamanites over the people at Helam.

Notes

Book of Mormon people